Edith Mary Wightman FSA (1 January 1938 – 17 December 1983) was a British ancient historian and archaeologist. She was Assistant-Professor and then Professor at McMaster University (1969–1983). Wightman was best known for her studies Roman Trier and Gallia Belgica.

Biography
Edith Mary Wightman was born on 1 January 1938 in Scotland, the daughter of R. J. and Edith W. Wightman. She undertook undergraduate studies at the University of St Andrews, receiving her MA in 1960. Next, she studied in Oxford with Ian Richmond and C.E. Stevens, receiving a diploma in Classical Archaeology in 1962, and a DPhil in 1968. Her dissertation on Roman Trier and the Treveri was published as a monograph in 1970. Wightman lectured at the University of Leicester from 1965 to 1969, before joining the Department of History at McMaster University in 1969, replacing her predecessor Edward Togo Salmon as Professor of Ancient History.

Wightman undertook archaeological fieldwork in the Mediterranean as part of three projects; at Monte Irsi under the direction of Alaster Small, as co-director of the Second Canadian Team excavations at Carthage alongside Colin Wells, and as the director of the multidisciplinary field survey project in the Liri Valley, Italy.

Wightman's work has been described as a "model of how to combine literary, epigraphic, and archaeological data with caution and imagination Research for Gallia Belgica involved annual research visits to archaeological institutes in Belgium, France, Germany and the Netherlands. Her posthumously published survey of Gallia Belgica has been described as "magisterial", and John Percival stated that "it is hard to think of a better study of an individual Roman province in terms of comprehensiveness and reliability". Underlying her work was a "concern for the Roman countryside and its population". She was noted for her skill as a researcher and as a teacher, and as "a much loved and respected scholar".

Death
Wightman was murdered on 17 December 1983 in her office at McMaster University. She was found lying on the floor with her eyes and mouth bound with surgical tape and her hands handcuffed behind her back. According to the police, credit cards were missing and robbery was probably the motive for the killing.

Honours
Wightman was elected as a Fellow of the Society of Antiquaries of London in 1973, a foreign associate member of the Société des Antiquaires de France in 1976, and a Fellow of the Royal Society of Canada in 1982.

Works
 Wightman, E. 1970. Roman Trier and the Treveri. Oxford
 Wightman, E.M. 1974. La Gaule chevelue entre César et Auguste. In Actes du IXeme Congres International d'études sur les Frontières Romaines, Mamaïa, 6-13 septembre 1972.
 Wightman, E.M. 1975. The pattern of rural settlement in Roman Gaul. ANRW 2.4: 584-657
 Wightman, E.M. 1977. Military arrangements, native settlements and related developments in early Roman Gaul. Helinium 17, 105-126.
 Wightman, E. 1978. Peasants and potentates: an investigation of social structure and land tenure in Roman Gaul. American Journal of Ancient History 3.
 Wightman, E. 1980. The plan of Roman Carthage, in New Light on Ancient Carthage (Ann Arbor, 1980), 29-46
 Wightman, E. 1981. The lower Liri valley: problems, trends and peculiaritiies. In G. Barker and R. Hodges (eds.) Archaeology and Italian Society. Prehistoric, Roman and Medieval Studies. Oxford: BAR International Series 102.
 Wightman, E. 1985. Gallia Belgica. London: B. T. Batsford
 Wightman, E.M. 1994a The Iron Age. In J.W. Hayes and I.P. Martini (eds.) Archaeological survey in the Lower Liri Valley, Central Italy (BAR International Series 595). Oxford, Tempus Reparatum. 13-17. 
 Wightman, E.M. 1994b Communications. In J.W. Hayes and I.P. Martini (eds.) Archaeological survey in the Lower Liri Valley, Central Italy (BAR International Series 595). Oxford, Tempus Reparatum. 30-33. 
 Hayes, J.W. and Wightman, E.M. (1984) Interamna Lirenas: risultati di ricerche in superficie 1979-1981. In S. QuiliciGigli (ed.) Archeologia Laziale VI (Quaderni del Centro di Studio per l'Archeologia Etrusco-Italica 8). Roma, Consiglio Nazionale delle Ricerche. 137-148.

References

1938 births
1983 deaths
Fellows of the Society of Antiquaries of London
Fellows of the Royal Society of Canada
Alumni of the University of St Andrews
Alumni of the University of Oxford
Classical archaeologists
British archaeologists
Academic staff of McMaster University
British women archaeologists
Scottish expatriates in Canada
British women historians
20th-century archaeologists
People murdered in Ontario
1983 murders in Canada
1983 in Ontario